Drybrough may refer to:

Colin Drybrough, Australian cricketer
Drybrough & Co, a Scottish brewery of the late 19th and 20th centuries
The Drybrough Cup, a football tournament sponsored by the brewery